The district of Arun, one of seven local government districts in the English county of West Sussex, has nearly 90 current and former places of worship.  68 active churches and chapels serve the dense urban development on the English Channel coast and the mostly rural hinterland of ancient towns and villages; a further 21 former places of worship still stand but are no longer in religious use.  Many churches, serving a wide variety of Christian denominations, are located in the main towns of Littlehampton and Bognor Regis—Victorian seaside resorts which form the focal points of the nearly continuous urban area around the River Arun estuary.  Surrounding villages, and their ancient and modern churches, have been absorbed by the 20th-century growth of these towns.  Further north, the important hilltop town of Arundel has a Roman Catholic cathedral and a long established Anglican church, and was a centre of Nonconformist worship.

English Heritage has awarded listed status to nearly 40 current and former church buildings in Arun.  A building is defined as "listed" when it is placed on a statutory register of buildings of "special architectural or historic interest" in accordance with the Planning (Listed Buildings and Conservation Areas) Act 1990.  The Department for Culture, Media and Sport, a Government department, is responsible for this; English Heritage, a non-departmental public body, acts as an agency of the department to administer the process and advise the department on relevant issues.  There are three grades of listing status. Grade I, the highest, is defined as being of "exceptional interest"; Grade II* is used for "particularly important buildings of more than special interest"; and Grade II, the lowest, is used for buildings of "special interest".  As of February 2001, there were 23 Grade I-listed buildings, 24 with Grade II* status and 913 Grade II-listed buildings in Arun.

Overview of the district and its places of worship

The district of Arun, created in 1974, covers a  area of the English Channel coast and its hinterland in the county of West Sussex.  Clockwise from the coast, it is bordered by the districts of Chichester, Horsham and Adur and the borough of Worthing.  Its name comes from the River Arun, which flows north–south through the middle of the district and reaches the sea at Littlehampton, one of the main towns and the district's administrative headquarters.  Littlehampton developed as a seaside resort in the 19th century; now, together with its eastern suburbs of Rustington, East Preston and Angmering (originally separate villages), it forms part of the Brighton/Worthing/Littlehampton conurbation. Each urban centre has several churches including an old Anglican parish church.  West of the Arun estuary, the Bognor Regis conurbation includes the suburbs of Elmer, Middleton-on-Sea, Felpham, Aldwick and Pagham, and the 19th-century seaside resort of Bognor (suffixed Regis from 1929) itself.  Many churches exist within this urban area as well.  The mostly flat hinterland supports a market gardening industry and several villages and suburbs whose development was stimulated by 19th-century rail links.  Further north, on the southern slopes of the South Downs, hamlets such as Madehurst, Houghton, Burpham and Poling have existed for hundreds of years, clustered around their churches.  Also in the north of the district is Arundel, an ancient hilltop town with a landmark castle and Roman Catholic cathedral which together make it "from a distance ... one of the great town views in England".  Until the coastal strip became heavily urbanised from the late 19th century, Arundel was the "main urban focus" of the area, and it supported places of worship for several Christian denominations.  Protestant Nonconformism was particularly strong in the town.

Anglicanism, England's state religion, is represented by ancient and modern churches throughout the district.  Simple Norman-era and early medieval buildings include those at Ford, Burpham (whose cruciform design is uncommon in the area), Tortington and Pagham.  Another period of churchbuilding started in the 19th century in response to increasing urbanisation.  In Bognor Regis, a church dedicated to St John the Baptist was built speculatively in 1821; it was pulled down in favour of Arthur Blomfield's large, "uninspired" replacement of 1886. This was in turn demolished in 1972, and the town's main Anglican church is now St Wilfrid's, a stone Gothic Revival building of 1910 by George Fellowes Prynne.  Littlehampton's parish church, dedicated to St Mary, has medieval origins but was completely rebuilt in 1826 and again in 1935 (in an "eerie, disembodied Gothic Revival" style according to Ian Nairn and Nikolaus Pevsner).  In the late 19th and 20th centuries, suburbs such as North Bersted, Aldwick and Wick were allocated parishes and given their own churches.  Mission rooms—small, cheap chapels of ease in outlying settlements distant from their parish church—were opened in places such as Lidsey, Westergate and Warningcamp.

Roman Catholic worship was outlawed for centuries after the English Reformation, but from the mid-19th century it experienced "a striking growth ... in and around Arundel", helped by the construction of the lavish Church of Our Lady and St Philip Howard in 1869–73.  This became Arundel Cathedral in 1965 when the Roman Catholic Diocese of Arundel and Brighton was created, and is the administrative centre of that region.  The staunchly Catholic Dukes of Norfolk, whose seat is at Arundel Castle, were influential in Catholicism's development in Arundel and the rest of England for many years.  An Anglican vicar of the 1860s said there were more Roman Catholics than Anglicans in the parish of Arundel, and about 750 lived in the area in 1973.  Elsewhere in the district, Roman Catholic worship has taken place at Slindon since the late 18th century, and the present church dates from 1865; a late-19th-century priest at Arundel founded churches at Angmering, Houghton (both now closed) and Littlehampton; and Rustington and East Preston gained churches in the 20th century.  Monks of the Servite Order founded Bognor Regis's Church of Our Lady of Sorrows in 1881.

Protestant Nonconformism—a strong force in Sussex since the 17th century—continues to thrive.  Baptists, Methodists, the United Reformed Church, Plymouth Brethren, Quakers and other denominations are represented in the main towns and in some cases the smaller villages: for example, Baptists have met at Walberton since the 1840s and Methodists at Westergate since 1851.  Congregationalists—predecessors of the current United Reformed denomination—found success in Arundel, where their chapel of 1838 (now a market) thrived until the late 20th century and established daughter churches in nearby villages such as Yapton.  Quakers in Littlehampton took over a former Penny School building as their place of worship, and converted barns house Brethren in Felpham, Evangelicals in Aldwick and Baptists in Angmering (whose "strangely towered" former chapel is now in residential use).  Baptists in Arundel and Walberton also sold their original chapels and built new ones.

For centuries, coastal erosion has affected the area covered by the modern district.  Several churches and whole settlements have been lost to the sea or to depopulation brought about by erosion.  Cudlow and Ilsham, both in Climping parish, lost their churches by the 17th century, as did nearby Atherington.  The church at Middleton-on-Sea fell into disrepair by the late 18th century, and the sea was eroding the graveyard, revealing dead bodies.  Destruction came in 1838, when a high tide engulfed the ruins.  A new church was built soon afterwards.  The ancient chapel of St Bartholomew at Bognor was washed away in the early 16th century.  In the parish of Angmering, only St Margaret's Church survives: it was described as the church of West Angmering during the medieval era, when East Angmering and Barpham each had their own building.  Barpham's fell down and went out of use in the 16th century, and East Angmering's was derelict by the same time and no longer survives.  Excavations in the 20th century revealed fragmentary remains of each.  Some other churches and chapels fell out of use before the English Reformation but survive in other uses—for example at Bilsham (now a house), Nyetimber (part of a retirement home complex) and Bailiffscourt (in the grounds of a luxury hotel).

Religious affiliation
According to the 2001 United Kingdom Census, 140,759 people lived in Arun.  Of these, 76.6% identified themselves as Christian, 0.38% were Muslim, 0.19% were Jewish, 0.18% were Buddhist, 0.1% were Hindu, 0.02% were Sikh, 0.29% followed another religion, 14.68% claimed no religious affiliation and 7.56% did not state their religion.  The proportion of Christians was higher than the 72.8% in England as a whole, and the proportions of people with no religious affiliation was similar to the national figure of 14.59%.  Other religions named in the Census had much lower proportions of followers than in England overall—the corresponding national percentages were 3.1% for Islam, 1.11% for Hinduism, 0.67% for Sikhism and 0.52% for Judaism—but the proportion of residents identifying with the "any other religion" category matched the national figure of 0.29%.

Administration
All Anglican churches in Arun district are part of the Diocese of Chichester, whose cathedral is at Chichester, and (with one exception) the Archdeaconry of Chichester—one of three subdivisions which make up the next highest level of administration.  In turn, this archdeaconry is divided into five deaneries.  The churches at Clapham, Ferring, Findon and Patching are in the Rural Deanery of Worthing.  Those at Aldingbourne, Aldwick, Angmering, Arundel, Barnham, Binsted, Bognor Regis, Burpham, Climping, East Preston, Eastergate, Felpham, Ford, Lyminster, Madehurst, Middleton-on-Sea, North Bersted, Pagham, Poling, Rustington, Slindon, South Bersted, South Stoke, Walberton, Wick and Yapton, and the two in Littlehampton, are part of the Rural Deanery of Arundel and Bognor.  Houghton's church is within the Rural Deanery of Petworth in the Archdeaconry of Horsham.

The Roman Catholic Diocese of Arundel and Brighton, whose cathedral is at Arundel, administers the district's eight Roman Catholic churches.  Those at Bognor Regis and Slindon, and Arundel Cathedral itself, are in Cathedral Deanery.  East Preston, Littlehampton and Rustington's churches are part of Worthing Deanery.

Some Methodist and United Reformed churches in the district are part of the South West Sussex United Area, founded in January 2010 as an ecumenical arrangement between the local Methodist Circuit and the Southern Synod of the United Reformed Church.  Bognor Regis, Felpham, Rustington and Westergate Methodist Churches, Pagham and Rustington United Reformed Churches and the Littlehampton United Church (a joint congregation of both denominations) are part of the United Area.

Baptist churches at Angmering, Aldwick, Arundel, Bognor Regis, Ferring and Littlehampton are administratively part of the West Sussex Network of the South Eastern Baptist Association.

Current places of worship

Former places of worship

See also
Grade I listed buildings in West Sussex
List of churches preserved by the Churches Conservation Trust in Southeast England
List of demolished places of worship in West Sussex

References

Notes

Bibliography

External links

Arun
Arun
Arun District